Douglas is a former township in the Canadian province of Nova Scotia. The township was the eventual destination of Loyalists fleeing the Siege of Ninety Six during the American Revolutionary War. In 1861, along with the township of Rawdon, Nova Scotia, the Douglas township became part of the newly formed Municipal District of East Hants, along with neighbouring townships.

The township is the site of the present-day communities of Kennetcook, Gore, Noel and Maitland.

History

After the American Revolution, the village was part of the Douglas Township, which was named after Sir Charles Douglas, 1st Baronet. The village was settled by the troops of the 84th Regiment of Foot (Royal Highland Emigrants) for their service in the war, protecting Nova Scotia from ongoing American Patriot attacks by land and sea.

In 1861, Douglas Township became part of the newly formed Municipal District of East Hants, along with neighbouring townships.

References

 John Duncanson. Rawdon and Douglas : two loyalists townships in Nova Scotia. 1989.

Former populated places in Nova Scotia